The following is a list of bands who had material released on London based label Fierce Panda Records

(x) is greater than (y)
Absent Kid
Acres of Lions
Agent Blue
Alterkicks
Apartment
Art Brut
Astronaut
Atlantic Dash
Battle
Bellatrix
Blackbud
Boy Kill Boy
Cablecar
Capdown
CAPITAL
Coldplay
David Ford
Dead Disco
Death Cab for Cutie
Desperate Journalist
Dweeb
Electricity in our Homes
Enjoyable Listens
Fightmilk
Further
Gledhill
Goldheart Assembly
Thee Heavenly Music Association
The Hot Puppies
Idlewild
iLiKETRAiNS
Jellicoe
Kari Kleiv
Keane
Kenickie
Kitchens of Distinction
Lapsus Linguae
Le Neon
Milo Greene
Make Good Your Escape
My Architects
Oasis
Pile
The Polyphonic Spree
Scarfo
Seafood
Shitdisco
Simple Kid
sixbyseven
The Blackout
The Disappointments
The Drama
The Features
The Immediate
The Revelations
The Vacation
This Girl
Twist
VLMV
Winnebago Deal
Wounds
Wreckless Eric
 Wynona Bleach
YMSS

See also
 Fierce Panda Records
 Fierce Panda Records compilations

Fierce Panda Records